The 1990 Nissan Sydney 500 was motor race held on 10 November 1990 at Eastern Creek Raceway in Sydney, New South Wales, Australia. The race, which was open to Group 3A Touring Cars, was the final round of both the 1990 Australian Endurance Championship and the 1990 Australian Manufacturers' Championship. Held over a distance of 500 kilometers, it was the first touring car event to be held at Eastern Creek Raceway.

The race was won by Larry Perkins and Tomas Mezera driving a Holden VL Commodore SS Group A SV.

Divisional structure

Cars competed in three engine capacity divisions.

Division 1
Division 1, for cars of 3001cc and Over engine capacity, featured the turbocharged Ford Sierras, Nissan Skylines and Toyota Supras and V8 Holden Commodores.

Division 2
Division 2, for cars of 1601 to 3000cc engine capacity, was composed of BMW M3s, a BMW 323i and a Mercedes-Benz 190E.

Division 3
Division 3, for cars of Up to 1600cc engine capacity, included various models of Toyota Corolla and Toyota Sprinter.

Official results
Race results as follows:

Statistics
 Pole Position - #1 Jim Richards - Nissan Skyline R32 GT-R - 1:35.26 
 Fastest Lap - #11 Larry Perkins - Holden VL Commodore SS Group A SV - 1:37.84 (new lap record)
 Winners' average speed - 140.61 km/h

References

See also
1990 Australian Touring Car season

Nissan Sydney 500
Motorsport at Eastern Creek Raceway